Giekau is a municipality in the district of Plön, in Schleswig-Holstein, Germany.

References

Plön (district)